Marcus White (born 26 October 1991) is a former professional Australian rules football player at the North Melbourne Football Club in the Australian Football League (AFL). He made his first appearance at the senior level in the 2010 AFL season.

References

External links

1991 births
Living people
North Melbourne Football Club players
Australian rules footballers from Victoria (Australia)
Calder Cannons players
North Ballarat Football Club players